Célestin Mouyabi (born 30 July 1957) is a Congolese footballer. He played in six matches for the Congo national football team in 1992 and 1993. He was named in Congo's squad for the 1992 African Cup of Nations tournament. Mouyabi also captained the national side and later became the team's coach.

References

1957 births
Living people
Republic of the Congo footballers
Republic of the Congo international footballers
1992 African Cup of Nations players
Place of birth missing (living people)
Association football defenders